X. darwini may refer to:

 Xyleborus darwini a bark beetle - List_of_Xyleborus_species#D
 Xylocopa darwini, the Galápagos carpenter bee, a species in the genus Xylocopa

See also 
 Darwini (disambiguation)